Zhang Huiguang (died  313), formally Empress Wuxiao (literally "the martial and filial empress"), was an empress of the Xiongnu-led Chinese Han Zhao dynasty. She was Liu Cong (Emperor Zhaowu)'s second wife.

Zhang Huiguang was the daughter of Zhang Shi (張寔, not to be confused as the Jin official whose domain later evolved into Former Liang), the nephew of Liu Cong's mother Empress Dowager Zhang.  In 312, at Empress Dowager Zhang's insistence, Liu Cong took Zhang Huiguang and her sister to be his concubines.  Later that year, he wanted to create another concubine, Liu Ying (劉英), empress, but Empress Zhang insisted that he create Zhang Huiguang empress.  He did so in early 313. Three months later, Empress Dowager Zhang died. Empress Zhang mourned her so greatly and was so depressed that she died as well.

References 

313 deaths
Former Zhao empresses
Year of birth unknown
4th-century Chinese people
4th-century Chinese women